Jamie Zeppa is the author of Beyond the Sky and the Earth: A Journey into Bhutan, which won the Banff Mountain Book Festival Award for Adventure Travel Writing, and a novel, Every Time We Say Goodbye.

Childhood and education
Zeppa's parents divorced when she was young and she was raised by her grandparents in Sault Ste. Marie.

Career
At age 23, Zeppa took a job teaching English in Bhutan.  She lived in Bhutan for nine years, converted from Catholicism to Buddhism, and married a former student, actor Tshewang Dendup, with whom she had a son.

She now teaches literature at Seneca College in Toronto.

Books

References

Canadian travel writers
Living people
Canadian women novelists
21st-century Canadian novelists
21st-century Canadian non-fiction writers
21st-century Canadian women writers
Year of birth missing (living people)